Gabriel LaBelle (born ) is a Canadian-American actor. He is best known for his leading role as young aspiring filmmaker Sammy Fabelman in Steven Spielberg's semi-autobiographical film The Fabelmans (2022), for which he received acclaim and won the Critics' Choice Movie Award for Best Young Performer.

LaBelle has also appeared in the action film The Predator (2018), in an episode of the Netflix horror series Brand New Cherry Flavor (2021), and in the Showtime drama series American Gigolo (2022).

Early life and education
LaBelle is from Vancouver, and is the son of producer and character actor Rob LaBelle. He was raised Jewish.

LaBelle began interest in acting at the age of 8 at a summer camp, playing roles in its musical productions of Footloose, Shrek The Musical and Aladdin. LaBelle made his on-screen acting debut in 2013 on an episode of the Canadian TV series Motive in a guest role, thanks to his father landing his son an agent and being a producer on the show. In 2017, he starred in the indie horror film Dead Shack, which premiered at the Vancouver International Film Festival and Fantasia Film Festival. It was in 2020 that LaBelle became fully committed to acting as a career and flew to Montreal to apply for theater programs, until the COVID-19 pandemic locked down the city. He ultimately got in to Concordia University’s drama program, but had to attend classes virtually. He also wanted to pursue a career in acting in New York City, but put the plans on hold to take care of his family at home. He also deleted his social media in early 2020 for these reasons, saying that doing so made him "a better actor because you want to be focused, creative and confident, but if you have this thing that destroys your attention span and takes up time away from original thought and further indulges your need for validation, that’s my whole job. I can’t have that in my front pocket. I try to dissociate from that desire. I’ve never seen any of that as good, even before auditioning for stuff."

Career

The Fabelmans
In March 2021, LaBelle received from casting director Cindy Tolan the offer to audition, among 2,000 other contenders, for the lead role of Sammy Fabelman in Steven Spielberg's The Fabelmans, which at the time had kept its title, plot and character names under wraps. Following his audition, he was initially not cast in the role until he received a virtual callback three months later, with Spielberg, Tolan and 38 other representatives in attendance, where he then won the part. On finally reading the script and learning the details about his character being a fictionalized version of Spielberg himself as a teenager for mostly the entire film, he recalled "When I was auditioning, the character’s name was Teenage Sammy - I thought as opposed to Adult Sammy ... I get the script and you’re reading it for 30 pages and he’s 6 and 8 years old. Page 35 or so Teenage Sammy comes along. OK, good! Now this is my part. It’s going to be a three-act movie, it’s going to be a Moonlight or something. I kept waiting for my exit but it never came." LaBelle described the experience of getting the role as "intimate" and that he "...felt in my bones it was the best performance I’d done in my life." To prepare for the role, LaBelle watched and re-watched some of Spielberg's films, such as Empire of the Sun (1987) and gained access to photographs, home movies and other material from Spielberg's family's archives. He was also taught how to use the 8mm and 16mm camera props that were used on set, which had real film inside of them, as well as how to cut and splice film stock using the editing machines and film projectors of the time period. He also got to keep the 8mm camera Sammy used to film the family camping trip and Escape to Nowhere short film as a souvenir after the completion of principal photography.

The Fabelmans premiered at the 2022 Toronto International Film Festival, where LaBelle's performance received critical acclaim and he was recognized as a 2022 TIFF Rising Star, and won the award for Best Young Performer at the 28th Critics' Choice Awards and the award for Breakthrough Performance from the National Board of Review (the latter for which he shared with Danielle Deadwyler for Till). The ensemble cast of the film was nominated for the Screen Actors Guild Award for Outstanding Performance by a Cast in a Motion Picture.

Later projects
After completion of filming on The Fabelmans, LaBelle moved to Los Angeles to pursue more film, television and theater projects as an actor, with intentions to also direct at some point. In 2022, LaBelle joined the cast of the Showtime series adaptation of American Gigolo, in the role of the young version of Julian Kaye, played by Jon Bernthal. That same year, he was cast in one of the lead roles in Adam Carter Rehmeier's coming-of-age comedy The Snack Shack, which began filming that summer.

Filmography

Film

Television

Awards and nominations

References

External links 
 

2000s births
Year of birth missing (living people)
Living people
21st-century American Jews
21st-century Canadian Jews
21st-century American male actors
21st-century Canadian male actors
American male child actors
American male film actors
American male television actors
Canadian male child actors
Canadian male film actors
Canadian male television actors
Jewish American male actors
Jewish Canadian male actors
Male actors from Vancouver